Coenaculum minutulum is a species of sea snail, a marine gastropod mollusk in the family Cimidae. The species is one of four known species to exist within the genus, Coenaculum with the other species being Coenaculum secundum, Coenaculum tertium and Coenaculum weerdtae.

References

External links
 To World Register of Marine Species

Cimidae
Gastropods described in 1900